Women have made significant contributions to photography since its inception. Notable participants include:

Afghanistan
 Farzana Wahidy (born 1984), documentary photographer concentrating on women's issues in Afghanistan

Algeria
 Zohra Bensemra (born 1968), photojournalist

Argentina

Australia

Austria

Azerbaijan
 Rena Effendi (born 1977), interested in the environment, post-conflict society, the effects of oil industry on people and social disparity

Belarus
 Ottilia Reizman (1914–1986), documentary film and news photographer
Tatsiana Tsyhanova (born 1978), portrait photographer

Belgium
Charlotte Abramow (born 1993), photographer and filmmaker
 Marleen Daniels (born 1958), photojournalist turned fashion photographer
 Jennifer Des (born 1975), photographer
Bieke Depoorter (born 1986), Magnum photographer, several photo books
 Martine Franck (1938–2012), documentary photographer and portrait photographer
 Cindy Frey (active since 2003), musical bands photographer
 Nathalie Gassel (born 1964), writer, photographer
 Aglaia Konrad (born 1960), photographer, educator
 Diana Lui (born 1968), Malaysian-Belgian artist, photographer
Régine Mahaux (born 1967), celebrity photographer
 Germaine Van Parys (1893–1983), pioneering photojournalist who joined Le Soir in 1922
Marie-Françoise Plissart (born 1954), architecture photographer, videoartist
 Agnès Varda (1928–2019), film director, photographer, educator
 Eva Vermandel (born 1974), has photographed in Iceland and Ireland
 Katrien Vermeire (born 1979), photographer, filmmaker
Stéphanie Windisch-Graetz (1939–2019), artistic portrait and animal photographer

Brazil
Claudia Andujar (born 1931), Swiss-born Brazilian photographer and photojournalist
Brígida Baltar (born 1959), visual artist and photographer
Alice Brill (1920–2013), German-born Brazilian photographer and painter
Angélica Dass (born 1979), photographer and lecturer
Luiza Prado (born 1988), artist, photographer
Rosângela Rennó (born 1962), artistic photographer
 Hildegard Rosenthal (1913–1990), German photographer noted for her work after emigration to Brazil
Juliana Stein (born 1970), visual artist and photographer
Cybèle Varela (born 1943), mixed-media artist
Alice Dellal (born 1987), model, photographer

Cameroon
Ginette Daleu (1977–2018), artist and photographer
 Angèle Etoundi Essamba (born 1962), humanist photographer of Africa

Canada

China (People's Republic)

Croatia
Marija Braut (1929–2015), artistic photographer
 Sanja Iveković (born 1949), photographer, sculptor and installation artist, creating photographic works early in her career, earning her the Camera Austria Award
 Ivana Tomljenović-Meller (1906–1988), photographer, poster designer, and teacher who attended the Bauhaus

Cuba
 Marta María Pérez Bravo (born 1959), black-and-white photography expressing mythological beliefs
 Lissette Solorzano (born 1969), medical photographer, photojournalist, widely exhibited

Czechoslovakia, Czech Republic
 Bohumila Bloudilová (1876–1946), portrait photographer
 Irena Blühová (1904–1991), documentary photographer, student of the Bauhaus and Bratislava School of Fine Arts
 Veronika Bromová (born 1966), specialist in new media applications
Anna Fárová (1928–2010), photography historian
 Eva Fuka (1927–2015), see United States
Jitka Hanzlová (born 1958), portrait photographer
 Libuše Jarcovjáková (born 1952), diaristic photographer
 Běla Kolářová  (1923–2010), Avant-garde photographer
 Markéta Luskačová (born 1944), social photographer, often covering children, also London's markets
 Emila Medková (1928–1985), influenced by surrealism
 Lucia Moholy (1894–1989), born in Prague, produced many of the photographs associated with the Bauhaus school, later working as a stage photographer in Berlin
 Marie Šechtlová (1928–2008), the poetry of the everyday

Democratic Republic of Congo 

 Gosette Lubondo (b. 1993), photographer
 Pamela Tulizo (b. 1994), photographer

Denmark

Ecuador 

 Isadora Romero photojournalist

Egypt

Estonia
 Ina Bandy (1903–1973), Tallinn-born humanist photographer, later based in Paris
Birgit Püve (born 1978), freelance photographer and photo editor
Katrina Tang (born 1985), fashion and portrait photographer
 Ann Tenno (born 1952), landscape photographer and photo artist, noted for her photographs of Tallinn and the churches and manor houses of Estonia

Ethiopia
Sheba Chhachhi (born 1958), photographer, filmmaker, artist
Eyerusalem Jiregna (born 1993), photographer and photojournalist
Aïda Muluneh (born 1974), photographer, photojournalist and contemporary artist

Finland
 Eija-Liisa Ahtila (born 1959), conceptual photographer and video artist
 Caroline Becker (1826–1881), the first professional female photographer in Finland
 Signe Brander (1869–1942), cityscapes of Helsinki
Adele Enersen (fl 2010s), writer, photographer, blogger
Elina Brotherus (born 1972), photographer, video artist
 Nanna Hänninen (born 1973), chaotic objects, urban landscapes, and plants with repainting
Marja Helander (born 1965), Sámi photographer, artist and filmmaker
Marjaana Kella (born 1961), portrait photographer and academic
 Sirkka-Liisa Konttinen (born 1948), has photographed the Newcastle district of Byker and created a Coal Coast series on the beach between Seaham and Hartlepool
Meeri Koutaniemi (born 1987), photographer and journalist
Tuija Lindström (1950–2017), photographer, artist and academic
 Susanna Majuri (1978–2020), captures short narrative scenes as if film stills
Laura Malmivaara (born 1973), actress, photographer and television host
Heli Rekula (born 1963), photographer and video maker
Victoria Schultz (fl 1970s), photographer and documentary film producer
Seita Vuorela (1971–2015), novelist and photographer
Saana Wang (born 1979), fine art photographer
 Julia Widgrén (1842–1917), early female professional photographer

France

Gambia
Khadija Saye (30 July 1992 – 14 June 2017)

Germany

Ghana 

 Felicia Abban (born 1935), Ghana's first female professional photographer
 Josephine Kuuire artist, photographer, and activist

Greece
 Ianna Andreadis (born 1960), combines photography with her interest in archaeology, also landscapes from southern Africa
Venia Bechrakis (fl 2000s), artist and fine art photographer
Mary Kay (fl 2000s), landscape photographer
 Nelly's (1899–1998), noted for her Greek temples, Berlin Olympics, later advertising, photo-reportages in the United States
Voula Papaioannou (1898–1990), photographer of Greek people and landscapes
 Mary Paraskeva (1882–1951), possibly the first Greek woman to have left a large photographic legacy from the beginning of the 20th century
 Athena Tacha (born 1936), conceptual photographer

Guatemala
 María Cristina Orive (1931–2017), photographer, reporter and photojournalist, co-founder of the La Azotea publishing the work of Latin American photographers

Hong Kong
Tang Ying Chi (born 1956), artist, curator, photographer
 Wong Wo Bik (graduated 1977), architectural photographer

Hungary
 Vivienne Balla (born 1986), fashion and fine art
 Ghitta Carell (1899–1972), Hungarian-born Italian portrait photographer
 Kati Horna (1912–2000), Hungarian-born Mexican photojournalist
 Judith Karasz (1912–1977), Bauhaus graduate
 Ergy Landau (1896–1967), Hungarian-born photographer, worked in Vienna, Berlin and latterly in Paris
 Mari Mahr (born 1941), Hungarian-British photographer 
 Olga Máté (1878–1961), early portrait photographer
 Ylla (born Camilla Koffler) (1911–1955), first to specialize in animal portraiture

Iceland
 Hansína Regína Björnsdóttir (1884–1972) 
María Guðmundsdóttir, filmmaker, photographer and actress
 Nicoline Weywadt (1848–1921), pioneering female photographer
 Rebekka Guðleifsdóttir (born 1978), whose work posted to Flickr led to employment in advertising campaigns

India
Sonal Ambani (fl 2000s), writer, artist and photographer
Rita Banerji (fl 2000s), writer, photographer and gender activist
Dimpy Bhalotia (born 1987), street photographer
Pamella Bordes (born 1961), worked as an international photojournalist for Gamma Press Photos, exhibitions include notable images from India and Cambodia, also self-portraits
Sue Darlow (1960–2011), photographer in the UK and India
Serin George (fl 2000s), fashion photographer and model
Gauri Gill (born 1970), contemporary photographer
Li Gotami Govinda (1906–1988), painter, photographer, writer and composer
 Indrani (born mid-1980s, Kolkata), full name Indrani Pal-Chaudhuri, India's best known fashion photographer, based in New York, known for her celebrity portraits such as David Bowie, Iman, Beyoncé, Kate Winslet, Will Smith, Lady Gaga, Kim Kardashian, Kanye West, also known as a Tribeca Film Festival Award-winning film director
 Saadiya Kochar (born 1979), first worked with the human body, portraits and then documentary (Kashmir)
Ashagi Lamiya (born 1989), artist, photographer and actress
 Richa Maheshwari (born 1988), a fashion and lifestyle photographer based in New Delhi
Pushpamala N. (born 1956), photographer and visual artist
Latika Nath (fl 2000s), writer, photographer and wildlife conservationist
 Rathika Ramasamy, India's first woman wildlife photographer, particularly of birds
Ketaki Sheth (born 1957), photographer and writer
 Dayanita Singh (born 1961), first photojournalism, later portraits and documentary work including Goa
Shobha Deepak Singh (born 1943), photographer, writer and dancer
 Sooni Taraporevala (born 1957), a screenwriter also working in photography, especially of India's Parsi Zoroastrian community
Hema Upadhyay (1972–2015), photographer and installation artist
Ajita Suchitra Veera (fl 2000s), film director, writer and photographer
 Homai Vyarawalla (1913–2012), India's first woman photojournalist, covered celebrities including Gandhi, Nehru, Jinnah and Indira Gandhi
 Annapurna Dutta (1894 - 1976), one of India's earliest professional female photographers; her photos featured Sarojini Naidu and others.

Iran
Sahar Ajdamsani (born 1996), singer, writer, photographer
Fatemeh Behboudi (born 1985), photojournalist and documentary photographer
 Parisa Damandan (born 1967), has collected portrait photographs illustrating the history of Isfahan, continuing her work after the 2003 Bam earthquake
Solmaz Daryani (born 1989), photographer and photojournalist
Zahra Amir Ebrahimi (born 1981), photographer, television actress and short movies director
 Shadi Ghadirian (born 1974), portraits of women dressed in traditional style, often juxtaposed with modern anomalies such as a mountain bike or cola can, now increasingly exhibited in the west
Hengameh Golestan (born 1952), pioneering woman photographer
Sooreh Hera (born 1973), artist and photographer
 Zahra Kazemi (1948–2003), Iranian-Canadian freeland photojournalist who died following arrest in Iran after covering poverty, destitutions and oppression in the Middle East
 Sanaz Mazinani (born 1978), Iranian-Canadian photographer and curator, installation based photography
 Shirin Neshat (born 1957), photos of women confronted by Islamic fundamentalism, later working with multimedia and film
 Ashraf os-Saltaneh (1863–1914), first woman photographer of Iran
 Shirana Shahbazi (born 1974), conceptual photography, installations
 Newsha Tavakolian (born 1981), Iranian documentary photographer
 Maryam Zandi (born 1947), founding board member of Iran's National Society of Photographers, has published many calendars of Iranian portraits

Iraq
 Halla Ayla (born 1957), photographer, painter

Ireland

 Rhiannon Adam (born 1985)
Elizabeth Hawkins-Whitshed (1860–1934), mountaineer, writer and photographer
Joan Kennelly (died 2007), photographer and photojournalist
 Jane Shackleton (1843–1909), pioneering Irish photographer
 Helen Sloan (active since 1994), still and film photographer, known for photographing the TV series Game of Thrones

Israel
Lili Almog (born 1961), photographer and mixed media artist
Dalia Amotz (1938–1994), photographer, works exhibited in Jerusalem's Israel Museum
Sheffy Bleier (born 1964), photographer and educator
 Elinor Carucci (born 1971), see United States
 Michal Chelbin (born 1974), former military photographer, several publications
 Liselotte Grschebina (1908–1994), German-born, emigrated to Palestine, roots in New Vision
Lea Golda Holterman (born 1976), commercial and artistic photographer
Naomi Leshem (born 1963), fine art photographer
 Sagit Zluf Namir (born 1978)
Angelika Sher (born 1969), Lithuanian-born Israeli photographer
 Tal Shochat (born 1974), fine arts photographer

Italy
 Letizia Battaglia (1935-2022), photojournalist in Sicily, specializing in coverage of the Mafia for the newspaper L'Ora
 Vanessa Beecroft (born 1969), photographer and performance artist, now in Los Angeles
 Monica Bonvicini (born 1965), sculptor, photographer, video artist, educator
 Ghitta Carell (1899–1972), Hungarian-born, naturalized Italian photographer fluent from 1930 to 1950
 Elisabetta Catalano (1944–2015), fine art photographer
 Marcella Campagnano (born 1941)
 Marina Cicogna (born 1934), film producer and photographer
 Francesca Dani (born 1979), travel photographer
 Yvonne De Rosa (born 1975), art photography
 Inge Feltrinelli (1930–2018), German-born Italian photographer and publisher
 Domiziana Giordano (born 1959), painter, actress, photographer and video artist
 Maria Eisner (1909–1991), Italian-American photographer, photo editor and photo agent
 Luisa Lambri (born 1969), working mainly on architecture and abstraction
 Otonella Mocellin (born 1966), photographer and video artist
 Tina Modotti (1896–1942), born in Italy, worked as a fine art photographer and documentarian, with Edward Weston, ran a studio in Mexico City
 Valentina Murabito (born 1981), photographer and visual artist
 Dianora Niccolini (born 1936), pioneer of male nude photography
 Virginia Oldoini (1837–1899), early proponent, aesthetically interested in images of herself, large collection in Metropolitan Museum of Art
 Priscilla Rattazzi (born 1956), Italian-American magazine photographer
 Chiara Samugheo (1935–2022), photographer, photojournalist
 Floria Sigismondi (born 1965), fashion, installations, video
 Grazia Toderi (born 1963), video artist and photographer
 Wanda Wulz (1903–1984), experimental fine art photographer

Jamaica
 Esther Anderson (born 1946), portraits and documentary work
 Maria LaYacona (1926–2019)
 Donnette Zacca (born 1957)

Japan

Kenya
 Mimi Cherono Ng'ok

Kuwait
 Maha Al-Asaker

Latvia
 Inta Ruka (born 1958), specializing in portraits of people in the areas where they live

Lithuania
 Esther Shalev-Gerz (born 1957), installation artist who also exhibits her photography
 Audronė Vaupšienė (born 1965), fashion photographer and collaborator in artworks

Luxembourg
Deborah De Robertis (born 1984), performance artist and photographer
 Marianne Majerus (born 1956), specializes in garden photography contributing widely to magazines and newspapers
Su-Mei Tse (born 1973), musician, artist and photographer

Mali
Fatoumata Diabaté (born 1980)

Malta
Adelaide Conroy (born 1839), early photographer in Valletta

Mexico

Morocco 

 Aassmaa Akhannouch (born 1973)
 Leila Alaoui (1982–2016)
 Lalla Essaydi (born 1956)
 Leila Ghandi (born 1980)

Namibia
 Margaret Courtney-Clarke (born 1949), documentary photographer and photojournalist

Netherlands

New Zealand

Nigeria

Norway

Pakistan
Bani Abidi (born 1971), fine art photographer and video artist
Saadia Sehar Haidari (born 1971), photojournalist
Sadia Khatri (fl 2010s), photographer and feminist activist
Farah Mahbub (born 1965), fine art photographer
 Farrukh Saleem (born 1988), Karachi based Female photographer known for her portraits and wedding photography

Palestine
 Karimeh Abbud (1896–1955), professional photographer in Nazareth in the 1930s, also producing postcards
 Sama Raena Alshaibi (born 1973), Iraq-born Palestinian–US conceptual artist, using photography, also an academic
 Rula Halawani (born 1964), photographer, photojournalist, educator
 Emily Jacir (born 1972), artist in photography and other media, also an academic
 Ahlam Shibli (born 1970), photographer of Bedouins of Palestinian descent

Peru
 Andrea Hamilton (born 1968), fine art photographer
Milagros de la Torre (fl 1990s), fine art photographer
Daphne Zileri (1936–2011), Argentine-born Peruvian photographer and photobook author

Poland
 Jadwiga Golcz (1866–1936), Polish photographer, one of pioneering women of the medium in Poland
 Lotte Beese (1903–1988)
 Helga Kohl (born 1943), Polish photographer based in Namibia
 Margaret Michaelis-Sachs (1902–1985), Austrian-Australian photographer of Polish-Jewish origin, portraits, architecture of Barcelona, Jewish quarter in Cracow
 Nata Piaskowski (1912–2004), Polish-born American photographer, portraits and landscapes, based in San Francisco
 Zofia Rydet (1911–1997), documented postwar Poland
 Faye Schulman (1924–2015), took photos during World War II
 Joanna Zastróżna (born 1972), photographer and filmmaker

Portugal
 Helena Almeida (1934–2018), conceptual painter and photographer
 Helena Corrêa de Barros (1910-2000), amateur photographer
 Ana Dias (born 1984), photographer of erotic femininity
Mónica de Miranda (born 1976), photographer and visual artist

Romania
 Alexandra Croitoru (born 1975), seeks to challenge accepted ideas of power sharing and gender in Romania
Marta Rădulescu (1912–1959), writer and photographer
Thea Segall (1929–2009), Romanian photographer who was based in Venezuela

Russia

Hélène Adant (1903–1985), Russian-born French photographer
 Evgenia Arbugaeva (born 1985), photographer of the Russian Arctic
Maria Bordy (born 1918), Russian-born press photographer active in the U.S.
 Anastasia Chernyavsky (fl 2010s), Russian-born photographer working in the U.S.
Tatyana Danilyants (born 1971), film director, photographer and poet
 Lena Herzog (born 1970), see United States
Masha Ivashintsova (1942–2000), photographer from St Petersburg
 Ida Kar (1908–1974), known for her portraits of artists and writers
 Anastasia Khoroshivlova (born 1978), artist and photographer
Galina Kmit (1931–2019), artist, photographer and photojournalist
 Diana Markosian (born 1989), documentary photographer who has photographed the north Caucasus and central Asia
 Elena Mrozovskaya (before 1892 – 1941), early Russian professional photographer
 Irina Popova (born 1986), Russian / Dutch documentary photographer
Galina Sanko (1904–1981), photojournalist and war photographer
Yulia Spiridonova (born 1986), photographer and contemporary artist
Danila Tkachenko (born 1989), visual artist and documentary photographer
Sophia Tolstaya (1844–1919), diarist and photographer
Natalia Turine (born 1964), German-born Russian photographer and journalist based in France

Singapore
 Marjorie Doggett (1921–2010), animal rights advocate, architectural photographer, and heritage conservationist
 Sim Chi Yin (born 1978), photojournalist

South Africa
Jenna Bass (born 1986), film director, photographer and writer
 Jodi Bieber (born 1966), known for taking the photograph of Bibi Aisha, the Afghanistan woman whose nose and ears were mutilated by her husband and brother-in-law
Hannelie Coetzee (fl 2000s), visual artist and professional photographer
Mbali Dhlamini (born 1990), artist and photographer 
Tracy Edser (born 1982), photojournalist and documentary producer
 Vera Elkan (1908–2008), remembered for her images of the International Brigades in the Spanish Civil War
 Phumzile Khanyile (born 1991)
 Constance Stuart Larrabee (1914–2000), South African's first female World War II correspondent, also known for images of South Africa
Carla Liesching (born 1985), visual artist specialising in photography
Nandipha Mntambo (born 1982), visual artist and photographer
Ruth Seopedi Motau (born 1968), professional photographer and photo editor
 Zanele Muholi (born 1972), has used photography in support of LGBTI issues, several solo and group exhibitions since 2004
 Neo Ntsoma (born 1972), known for being the first woman recipient of the Mohamed Amin Award, the CNN African Journalist of the Year Prize Photography
 Jo Ractliffe (born 1961), photographer and teacher
Lesley Rochat (fl 2000s), conservationist and underwater photographer
 Colla Swart (born 1930), photographs of people, landscapes and flowers in Namaqualand
 Nontsikelelo Veleko (born 1977), depicts black identity
 Gisèle Wulfsohn (1957–2011), covered the struggle against apartheid and HIV/AIDS awareness initiatives

South Korea
Jun Ahn (fl 2000s), photographer known for her Self-Portrait series
Bae Doona (born 1979), actress and photographer
Ina Jang (born 1982), South Korean photographer based in the United States
Miru Kim (born 1981), artist, photographer and arts events coordinator
Jungjin Lee (born 1961), photographer and artist based in New York
 Nikki S. Lee (born 1970), self-portraits posing in various ethnic and social groups such as punks, hip-hop musicians, male partners
Soi Park (fl 2010s), fine art photographer

Spain

Sweden

Switzerland
 Hélène Binet (born 1959), first photographed in the Grand Théâtre de Genève before turning to architectural photography, now based in London
 Mauren Brodbeck (born in 1974), photography
Martha Burkhardt (1874–1956), painter and photographer
Claudia Christen (born 1973), multi-disciplinary designer and photographer
Laurence Deonna (born 1937), journalist, writer and photographer
Alwina Gossauer (1841–1926), early professional photographer
Henriette Grindat (1923–1986), artistic photographer in the post-war period inspired by the surrealistic trends of the times
Beatrice Helg (born 1946), fine art photographer
Olivia Heussler (born 1957), photographer documenting political and cultural events
Monique Jacot (born 1934), photojournalist
Rosa Lachenmeier (born 1959), painter and photographer
Catherine Leutenegger (born 1983), visual artist and photographer
Ella Maillart (1903–1997), travel photography
Franziska Möllinger (1817–1880), Switzerland's first female photographer
Karin Muller (born 1965), author, filmmaker, photographer and adventurer
Marie-Jeanne Musiol (born 1950), Canadian-Swiss photographer
Marguerite Naville (1852–1930), painter, illustrator and photographer of Egyptian archaeological finds
Leta Peer (1964–2012), painter and fine art photographer
Julieta Schildknecht (born 1960), Swiss-Brazilian photographer and journalist
 Annemarie Schwarzenbach (1908–1942), prolific writer and photographer, leaving some 50 photo reports documenting the rise of the Nazis in Germany and her travels to the Middle East and the United States
Eva Sulzer (1909–1990), photographer, musician, collector and filmmaker

Turkey
Eylül Aslan (fl 2000s), fine art photographer and feminist
Nilüfer Demir (born 1986), photojournalist and photographer
Elvin Eksioglu (born 1966), film director photographer and screenwriter
 Semiha Es (1912–2012), Turkey's first female photojournalist, worked between 1950 and 1970s as a war photographer
 Yıldız Moran (1932–1995)
 Maryam Şahinyan (1911–1996), Turkey's first female photographer, managing a studio from 1937, archive of some 200,000 images
 Naciye Suman (1881–1973), Turkey's first Muslim female photographer, owning a studio from 1919 to 1930

Ukraine
 Elena Filatova (born 1974), photographs of the Chernobyl area

United Kingdom

United States

Uzbekistan
 Umida Akhmedova (born 1955), photojournalist working in Central Asia, arrested in 2010 for her images of the Uzbek people

Yemen
Alaa Al-Eryani (born 1990), photographer, filmmaker, writer, and feminist activist

Gallery

See also
Timeline of women in photography
List of photographers

References

Further reading
 
 

Women in photography
Photographers